Andrey Petrovich Semyonov-Tyan-Shansky (9 June 1866–1942) was a Russian entomologist specializing in beetles. He was the son of Pyotr Semyonov-Tyan-Shansky.

He entered the St. Petersburg University in 1885. In 1888 and 1889 he traveled to the Trans-Caspian and Turkestan regions in search of insects, then in 1890 became a curator at the Imperial Academy of Sciences. He worked at the museum only until 1896 and then worked at his home. He studied mainly the Hymenoptera and Dermaptera. Citations of this author most frequently bear the spelling Semenov-Tian-Shanskij (e.g. ). He also took an interest in the poetry of Pushkin, the protection of nature, and a range of other subjects. He died from pneumonia during the siege of Leningrad.

References

External links
Bio with photos

1866 births
1942 deaths
Russian biologists
Russian entomologists
Coleopterists
Saint Petersburg State University alumni
Soviet entomologists
Victims of the Siege of Leningrad
Deaths from pneumonia in the Soviet Union
Deaths from pneumonia in Russia